Senator Sanderson may refer to:

George Sanderson (politician) (1810–1886), Pennsylvania State Senate
John P. Sanderson (1818–1864), Pennsylvania State Senate
John Pease Sanderson (1816–1871), Florida State Senate
Robert B. Sanderson (1825–1887), Wisconsin State Senate